Shreck may refer to:

Fictional characters 
Shreck, the previous name of "Terror" from the comic book Terror Inc.
 Max Shreck, a Batman character
 Charles "Chip" Shreck, a Batman character from the film Batman Returns
 Vicktor Shreck, a character from Help Desk

See also
 Shrek (disambiguation)
 Schreck (disambiguation)